Nippletop is a  elevation white Navajo Sandstone summit located in Zion National Park, in Washington County of southwest Utah, United States. Precipitation runoff from this unofficially named mountain drains into tributaries of the Virgin River.

Climate
Spring and fall are the most favorable seasons to visit Nippletop. According to the Köppen climate classification system, it is located in a Cold semi-arid climate zone, which is defined by the coldest month having an average mean temperature below , and at least 50% of the total annual precipitation being received during the spring and summer.

See also

 Geology of the Zion and Kolob canyons area
 Colorado Plateau

References

External links
 Zion National Park National Park Service
 Weather forecast: National Weather Service

Mountains of Utah
Zion National Park
Sandstone formations of the United States
Colorado Plateau
Landforms of Washington County, Utah
North American 2000 m summits